An agent provocateur is a person employed to act undercover to entice or provoke another person to commit an illegal or rash act.

Agent provocateur or Provocateur may also refer to:

 Agent Provocateur (album), by Foreigner
 Agent Provocateur (band), a UK electronica group
 Agent Provocateur (lingerie), a British lingerie brand
 Provocateur (film) or Agent Provocateur, a 1998 movie directed by Jim Donovan
 Provocateur (TV series), a 2017 Hong Kong television drama

See also
 Provocator, a shoot 'em up computer game